The Jôf di Montasio (Italian) is located in the Province of Udine, in the Friuli-Venezia Giulia region of northeastern Italy.

The Julian Alps are part of the Southern Limestone Alps System.

History
In World War I the mountain crest up to the Sella Nevea pass was part of the Italian Front and permanently manned by the Alpini. However, no hostilities happened here as the northern slope of the mountain was too steep for an attack by the Austro-Hungarian Army.

Culture
In the valleys around the mountain, local people speak four languages - Italian, Friulian, Slovene, and German. The original German name for the mountain was Bramkofel, while the original Slovene name was Špik nad Policami or Poliški Špik. However nowadays they mostly use Montasch and Montaž, borrowed from the Friulian name.

At the top of the mountain stands a cross and a bell in memory of Riccardo Deffar.

Climbing routes
There are many climbing routes from all sides. Many of them are hard rock climbing routes and ferratas, in particular from the north-east side. The normal mountaineering route is from the south side. It passes the Rifugio Brazza, at round 1650 m above the sea level. After that you can choose either the direction towards the Pipan ladder, or towards Findenegg Couloir and Suringar bivouac which is at 2400 m above the sea level.

The Ladder is 60 meters long steel structure and you should have ferrata equipment. Some sections in the Findenegg Couloir route are a bit exposed, and you also have some simple scramble at several places above the Suringar bivouac.

See also
List of Alpine peaks by prominence

References

External links 
 Jôf di Montasio/Montaž at Hribi.net
 "Jôf di Montasio, Italy" on Peakbagger
 Jof di Montasio (Montaz) - Route description on Mountains for Everybody

Mountains of the Julian Alps
Mountains of Friuli-Venezia Giulia
Province of Udine